The Govenaires Drum and Bugle Corps is an all age drum and bugle corps based in St. Peter, Minnesota, US, that competes in Drum Corps Associates (DCA). Founded in 1927, the Governaires are the oldest continuously active drum and bugle corps. The Governaires are four time DCA Class A World Champions.

History 
In 1927, a local meat market owner by the name of Ruben Siebert founded the St. Peter Legion Corps. The corps was composed mainly of World War I veterans who were members of the William R. Witty American Legion Post 37 in St. Peter. Highlights of the early years of the corps included many parades, festivals, and state competitions. Karl Klein, a member of the St. Peter Legion Corps, recalled a trip to Winnipeg, Manitoba, as well (Hanson, 2003).

Although there were hard times sustaining the corps during the Great Depression and throughout the 1930s and early 1940s, the corps continued to perform. In 1944, Cliff Hermel took over the reins of the drum corps and changed its name to the St. Peter Drum and Bugle Corps. This name change was in response to a growing Veterans of Foreign Wars (VFW) drum corps circuit in Minnesota in which the St. Peter corps joined and eventually dominated in the 1950s and early 1960s with 10 state championships. Hermel continued leading the corps into the 1970s also creating two other corps in St. Peter, the Black Knights for children 8–13 years old and the Crusaders for members of the ages 14–20 years old. These corps did not exist long, but the tenacity and highly motivated leadership of Cliff Hermel is evident through their formation.

During the 1950s, drum corps around the country began adopting names that did not reflect their sponsorships, similar to what sports teams do. In 1961, the St. Peter Drum and Bugle elected to change their name to the Vikings Drum and Bugle Corps. This name did not last long because the newly formed professional football team in Minnesota selected the same name and the members of the St. Peter corps did not want to give the impression of affiliation with the new football club. Thus, the drum corps was once again renamed this time they chose the name Govenaires to honor the five governors of Minnesota who hailed from St, Peter. To this day, the spelling of Govenaires is a mystery. Most would assume that the name should be spelled as Governaires and it is consistently misspelled this way, but nevertheless the name was changed to the Govenaires and has remained such to this day.

The Govenaires, under the direction of Hermel, saw an incredible amount of success on the competition field. Besides winning ten VFW State Championships and an American Legion State Championship, the corps ventured to its first national championship in 1964 in Dallas, Texas, where they took fourth place. During this period, Billy Stangler and Pat Mayer began their reigns in various corps leadership roles. The 1960s also introduced the first women into the Govenaires ranks. Margaret Mayer, Pat's wife, became the first female member and eventually became a key player in keeping the corps running through the 1970s and 1980s.

The 1970s were marked by two trips to the American Legion National Championships. The first, in 1976, was a long haul to Seattle, Washington. Unfortunately for the Govenaires, they were the only corps in their class that attended the championships that year and therefore no competition was held. Although the Govenaires were not crowned champions, the trip was viewed as highly successful and even though they experienced a bus breakdown in Butte, Montana that caused the already lengthy trip home longer, the corps decided to make the journey to the next season's American Legion National Championship in Denver. This year, the Govenaires did have competition at the championships and were runners-up in their class.

The next decade, the 1980s, were marked by the corps' introduction to the Midwest circuit, Drum Corps Midwest (DCM). The Govenaires began competing in the DCM championships in 1982 and still competed there until the circuit folded in 2005. Another trip to the American Legion National Championships in 1985 in New Orleans was yet another highlight of the corps. During this decade, the corps was led by many different directors of operations, but the constant presence of Pat and Margaret Mayer in leadership roles is evident. The Mayers also became the owners of a local pub in St. Peter, Patrick's, which became and still is the home base for Govenaires. The pub celebrates the history of the Govenaires with corps memorabilia and has become an integral location to the Govenaires and its membership.

After some extremely thin years in the late 1980s, Pat and Margaret's son, John, took over as director in 1990. John took over a drum corps in crisis. The reputation of the Govenaires had been suffering in the community and the membership base was at an all-time low. Nevertheless, the Govenaires competed with 17 members at the DCM Midwest Championships and were able to make an impression on the audiences. Although the judge's scores were low, the corps exhibited an ability to entertain the audiences by playing their final song "Show Me the Way to Go Home" on the track in front of the competition field while throwing candy into the crowd. This stress on entertainment over competition still exists in the corps today and ended up being a pivotal decision made by Mayer at the time.

The next 15 years showed growth in the talent pool entering the corps. By 1995, the corps contained 57 members and was beginning to consistently beat corps of greater size. The late 1990s also marked the time when the Govenaires built up a convoy of three buses and an equipment truck to make transportation easier for everybody in the corps. Each vehicle was painted Kelly green with a racing stripe of black with a white border. This pattern became an identifying feature of the corps which is now portrayed on all of the Govenaires souvenirs, the corps website, and the now-famous "Govie buttons" that are displayed on the corps' uniforms and distributed to fans of the corps.

In 2004, the decision to take the Govenaires to the Drum Corps Associates (DCA) World Championships was made. Featuring an international field of drum corps, DCA had become an important circuit within the drum and bugle corps community. The corps decided to make its first ever trip out east to Scranton, Pennsylvania to compete. Having a membership base of only 38 performers, the Govenaires placed second in the Class A division and sparked a national following that was previously nonexistent. People marveled at how well the corps performed for its size, but to the members of the Govenaires it was business as usual.

The next season marked another Class A second place followed by the Class A championship in 2006 at Rochester. The 2007 version of the Govenaires marked yet another second place in DCA's Class A .

The corps fell to 6th place at DCA in 2008 but returned to the top in 2009, winning their second Class A championship. A fourth-place finish in 2010 was followed by DCA championship number 3 in 2011. Three successive second-place finishes in 2012–14 led to the Governaires' fourth DCA Class A title in 2015.

The fan base of the Govenaires continues to grow, and the classic introduction continues to be recited at the beginning of every show: "Ladies and Gentlemen... The men and women you see before you comprise the oldest drum and bugle corps in the world. We come from the beautiful city of St. Peter, and we are the Govenaires!"

Competitions 
Each year since 2004, barring 2020 due to complications with the COVID-19 pandemic, the Govenaires have competed at the DCA World Championships, as well as many local contests.

In August the Govenaires host their annual competition in the St. Peter area called the Drum Corps Expo.

Show Summary (1992-2022) 
Green - DCM All-Age
Red - DCI All-Age
Gray - DCA Class A Participant
Blue - DCA Class A Finalist
Gold - DCA Class A Champion
Purple - DCA Open Class Finalist

Slogan 
Dedication to Performance,

Pride in the Corps,

Fun with the People.

Seasons of note

2004 
In its first appearance at DCA, the corps received a score of 75.163 and finished 2nd, performing its debut show Livin's Easy.

2006 
In the poor conditions that Hurricane Ernesto left for Drum Corp Championships in 2006, the Govenaires were able to win their first DCA Class A World Championship with a score of 78.625.  The show was entitled Get on the Bus.

2008 
The Govenaires Winter Guard won the 2008 Northstar Circuit Independent World Championships.

2009
The 2009 Govenaires claimed the DCA Class A World Champions for the second time. They took top caption honors in Effect, Brass, and Color Guard.

2011
The Govenaires were crowned DCA Class A World Champions for the third time.  In the Open Class Division, Minnesota Brass also won, resulting in an event known as the Minnesota Sweep.

2015
Govenaires won their fourth DCA Class A crown in Rochester, New York, on September 6.

References

External links 
 Govenaires Drum and Bugle Corps
 Goveraires historical repertoires and scores
 Drum Corps Associates

Drum Corps Associates corps
Organizations based in Minnesota
1927 establishments in Minnesota
Musical groups established in 1927